Ka Chona is a village in the province Nangarhar in Afghanistan.

At a wedding party on July 6, 2008, 47 Afghan civilians were killed by the US Air Force.

See also 
Nangarhar Province

External links 
 The Times. July 7, 2008. Afghan inquiry into American bombing of 'wedding party'. Tom Coghlan in Kabul
 Afghans Say New U.S. Strike Killed Civilians. By ABDUL WAHEED WAFA
 Afghanistan: Bomben auf die Hochzeit. Helmut Lorscheid 28.07.2008
 Das ungenannte Massaker
 Bomben auf Hochzeitsfeier. junge Welt, 12. Juli 2008
 Nichts Genaues weiß man nicht Von HELMUT  LORSCHEID, 24. Juli 2008
 Another wedding party massacre
 Terror aus der Luft. Von Rüdiger Göbel
  Das ungenannte Massaker
 Afghan government says 47 civilians killed when US bombed wedding party

Populated places in Nangarhar Province